Macroprotodon cucullatus, commonly known as the false smooth snake, is a species of mildly venomous colubrid snake endemic to the Mediterranean Basin.

Geographic distribution
M. cucullatus is found in Algeria, Egypt, Israel, Italy, Libya, Morocco, Palestinian Territories, Portugal, Spain, and Tunisia.

Description
Macroprotodon cucullatus is a small snake, usually not exceeding  in total length (including tail). As the common name implies, the dorsal scales are smooth, and are arranged in 19-23 rows. Dorsally it is tan or gray, with small brown spots, or with darker and lighter streaks. Ventrally it is yellow to coral-red, uniform or spotted with black, the spots sometimes confluent at the midline. It has a blackish collar which may extend to the top of the head. There is usually a dark streak from the nostril to the corner of the mouth, passing under or through the eye. The eye is rather small, and the pupil, when seen contracted in bright light, is oval. The snout is flattened, and the rostral is wide and low, barely visible from above. The 6th upper labial extends upward and contacts the parietal. There is usually one anterior temporal.

Habitat
The natural habitats of M. cucullatus are temperate forests, temperate shrubland, subtropical or tropical dry shrubland, Mediterranean-type shrubby vegetation, freshwater spring, rocky areas, sandy shores, arable land, pastureland, plantations, rural gardens, and urban areas.

Behaviour
The false smooth snake is nocturnal in some parts of its range but mainly diurnal in the Balearic Islands.

Diet
M. cucullatus preys upon small lizards such as geckos and lizards of the genus Lacerta. Small mammals and nestling birds are also eaten.

Reproduction
Females of M. cucullatus may breed in alternate years. Two to six eggs are laid in a damp spot under a stone, buried in the soil or hidden in dense vegetation.

Venom
M. cucullatus possesses a mild venom, which is delivered by means of enlarged grooved teeth in the upper jaw. Although the venom is effective on lizards, this snake is not harmful to humans due to its small size.

Conservation status
The IUCN has listed the false smooth snake as being of "Least Concern". This is because it has a wide distribution and a large population, seems to be tolerant of some habitat modification and its population is unlikely to be declining fast enough to qualify it for listing in a more threatened category.

See also
List of reptiles of Italy

References

Further reading
Busack, S.D., and C.J. McCoy (1990). "Distribution, variation, and biology of Macroprotodon cucullatus (Reptilia: Colubridae: Boiginae)". Annals of Carnegie Museum 59 (4): 261-286.
Geoffroy Saint-Hilaire, [I.] (1827). "Description des reptiles qui se trouvent en Égypte ". pp. 115–160 + plates. In: Savigny, M.J.C. (1809-1827). Description de l'Égypte ... [Volume 24]. Paris: C.L.F. Panckoucke. (Second Edition, 1829). (Coluber cucullatus, new species, pp. 148, 151 + Plate 8, figures 3 & 3').

External links
Corti, C.; Mellado, V.P.; Geniez, P.; El Din, S.B.; Martinez-Solano, I; Sindaco, R.; Romano, A. (2009). IUCN (International Union for Conservation of Nature and Natural Resources) Red List Assessment, Version 3.1. http://eol.org/data_objects/18923870. Accessed October 2013.
Macroprotodon cucullatus (Geoffroy Saint-Hilaire, 1827) .

Macroprotodon
Snakes of Africa
Snakes of Asia
Reptiles of Europe
Fauna of the Middle East
Reptiles of North Africa
Reptiles described in 1827
Taxa named by Isidore Geoffroy Saint-Hilaire
Taxonomy articles created by Polbot